is a city located in Tochigi Prefecture, Japan. ,  the city had an estimated population of 115,794 in 48,437 households, and a population density of 67 persons per km².

Geography
Nasushiobara is the northernmost city in the Kantō region of Japan, bordering Fukushima Prefecture to the north. It is located in the northern portion of Tochigi Prefecture, in the mountains.

Surrounding municipalities
Tochigi Prefecture
 Ōtawara
 Yaita
 Nikko
 Shioya
Nasu
Fukushima Prefecture
Minamiaizu
Shimogō
Nishigō

Climate
Nasushiobara has a humid subtropical climate (Köppen Cfa) characterized by warm to hot summers and cool winters with heavy snowfall.

Demographics
Per Japanese census data, the population of Nasushiobara has recently plateaued after a century of strong growth.

History
Before the Meiji period, the area which is now Nasushiobara was mostly uninhabited wasteland, due to lack of suitable water for agriculture. Ōtawara Domain built a number of irrigation canals during the Edo Period, but the scale was small. However, in the Meiji period, the Nasu Canal and other agricultural development projects aimed at opening the region to farming led to rapid development, and many local place names still bear the names of various government officials of the Meiji period.  With the establishment of the modern municipalities system on April 1, 1889, the villages of Karino, Takabayashi, Nabekake, Nishi-Nasuno, Higashi-Nasuno in Nasu District, and Shiobara in Shioya District were formed. A portion of Higashi-Nasuno became the town of Kuroiso in 1912. Shiobara became a town in 1919, and Nishi-Nasuno in 1932. In 1955, Kuroiso annexed Takabayashi, Nabekake and the remainder of Higashi-Nasuno, and Nishi-Nasuno annexed Kariya. Kuroiso became a city in 1970, and Shiobara was transferred to Nasu District in 1982. The modern city of Nasushiobara was established on January 1, 2005, from the merger of the former city of Kuroiso, and the towns of Nishinasuno and Shiobara (both previously constituent towns of Nasu District).

Government
Nasushiobara has a mayor-council form of government with a directly elected mayor and a unicameral city assembly of 26 members. Nasushiobara, together with the town of Nasu collectively contributes four members to the Tochigi Prefectural Assembly. In terms of national politics, the city is part of Tochigi 3rd district of the lower house of the Diet of Japan.

Economy
Nasushiobara relies heavily on seasonal tourism to its hot spring and ski resorts. Agriculture is centered on dairy production. The city mascot, Miruhi, was created to represent the city's dairy production. The city also has several industrial parks.

Education
Utsunomiya Kyowa University
Nasushiobara has 20 public primary schools, ten public middle schools and one combined primary/middle school operated by the city government. The city has four public high schools operated by the Tochigi Prefectural Board of Education. The prefectural also operates one special education school for the handicapped.

Transportation

Railway
 JR East – Tōhoku Shinkansen

 JR East –Tōhoku Main Line (Utsunomiya Line)
 –  –

Highway
  – Nishinasuno Interchange – Kuroiso Interchange

Local attractions
Nasushiobara serves as a gateway for tourism in northern Tochigi.
Shiobara onsen
Itamuro onsen
former house of Aoki Shuzo
Nogi Jinja (former residence of General Nogi Maresuke)
former Shiobara Imperial Palace
Hunter Mountain Shiobara
Momiji-dani Suspension Bridge

Noted people
Hiromi Hara, professional football player
Yoko Shibui, Olympic runner 
Aya Hirayama, actress
Yoshimi Watanabe, politician
Masayoshi Takayama, three-star Michelin head chef of the Manhattan sushi restaurant Masa (born in Kuroiso)

References

External links

Official Website 
 Shiobara Onsen

Cities in Tochigi Prefecture
Nasushiobara